William Campbell (born 1878, date of death unknown) was a Scottish international lawn bowls player who competed in the 1930 British Empire Games.

Bowls career
At the 1930 British Empire Games he won the bronze medal in the rinks (fours) event with David Fraser, John Orr and Canadian Tom Chambers who joined the team following the death of original team member J Kennedy.

Personal life
He was a Commission Agent by trade and lived in Miller Place, Stirling.

References

Scottish male bowls players
Bowls players at the 1930 British Empire Games
Commonwealth Games bronze medallists for Scotland
Commonwealth Games medallists in lawn bowls
1878 births
Year of death missing
Medallists at the 1930 British Empire Games